The Big Game is a 1942 German sports film directed by Robert A. Stemmle and starring René Deltgen, Gustav Knuth and Heinz Engelmann. It featured famous German footballers of the era. National coach Sepp Herberger arranged for many German international footballers to be recalled from fighting in the Second World War, ostensibly to improve the quality of the film, but actually to try to protect them from the horrors of war.

Some sequences of the film are in Agfacolor. The sets were designed by art directors Gerbert Hochreiter and Walter Schlick.

Partial cast

Bibliography

References

External links

1942 films
1940s sports films
German sports films
Films of Nazi Germany
1940s German-language films
Films directed by Robert A. Stemmle
German association football films
Bavaria Film films
German black-and-white films
Cockfighting in film
1940s German films